Stephen, Steven or Steve Price may refer to:

Government and military 
 Stephen Price (Australian politician) (born 1969), member of the Western Australian Legislative Assembly
 Stephen Price (born 1572) of Gray's Inn, London, member of Parliament for New Radnor Boroughs in 1601
 Stephen Price (died 1562), member of Parliament for Radnorshire, Wales in 1555
 Stephen Price (RAF officer) (1893–1974), English flying ace during World War I

Media, journalism, and writing 
 Steve Price (broadcaster) (born 1955), Australian radio journalist
 Steven Price (businessman) (born 1962), American businessman, co-founder of Townsquare Media, and minority owner of the Atlanta Hawks
 Steven Price (writer), Canadian poet and novelist

Music, film, and theatre 
 Stephen Price (theatre manager) (1782–1840), manager of the Park Theatre in New York and Drury Lane in London
 Steve Price (musician), American percussionist for the band Pablo Cruise
 Steven Price (composer) (born 1977), British composer, best known for scoring Gravity (2013)
 Steven Price, a fictional character in the 2011 film Abduction

Sport 
 Stephen Price (cricketer) (born 1979), English cricketer
 Steve Price (coach) (born 1977), Australian rugby league coach
 Steve Price (rugby league) (born 1974), Australian rugby league footballer

Business 
 Stephen Price (lawyer) (born 1961), Australian lawyer and Chairman of Corrs Chambers Westgarth